Gunhild Seim (born 4 June 1973 in Gjøvik, Norway) is a Norwegian jazz musician (trumpet) and composer.

Career 
Involved in bands like the jazz quartet Gunhild Seim & Time Jungle and the contemporary ensemble Kitchen Orchestra. Having released several critically acclaimed albums and written commissioned works including Story Water for the Vossajazz 2012. As part of the Stavanger jazz and contemporary music scene including the bands "Kitchen Orchestra" and "Time Jungle", and with the latter she has been touring Norway, Sweden, the U.K. and Germany. Seim is in constant search for the unheard and untried. Thus her music also are inspired by everything from electronic and psychedelic rock to folk and country.

Seim has composed music for the likes of 'The Norwegian Wind Ensemble', Marilyn Crispell, Katya Sourikova, 'Banff Jazz Orchestra' and Trym Bjønnes. Her has been performing under the leadership of musicians and composers like Alex Von Schlippenbach, Evan Parker, Keith Tippett, Nils Henrik Asheim and many others. In May 2012 she was invited to collaborate with the 'Kitchen Orchestra', doing a residency lasting for five days, at the Superdeluxe, a center for experimental music, performance and art in Tokyo.

Discography

Solo albums 

Within "Time Jungle»
2007: Time Jungle (Master Records)
2009: Morpho (Mudi Records)
2012: Elephant Wings (Drollehala Records), feat Marilyn Crispell

Singles 
With "Kitchen Orchestra»
2010: Jul (I Sin Helhet) På Jæren (Checkpoint Charlie Audio Productions), with Pål Jackman
2011: Pumper Julen Rett Inn (Checkpoint Charlie Audio Productions)

References

External links 

Renaud Garcia-Fons: NPR Music Tiny Desk Concert on YouTube

1973 births
Living people
Musicians from Gjøvik
Norwegian women jazz singers
Norwegian jazz trumpeters
20th-century Norwegian trumpeters
21st-century Norwegian trumpeters
20th-century Norwegian women singers
20th-century Norwegian singers
21st-century Norwegian women singers
21st-century Norwegian singers
Women trumpeters